Tahir ibn 'Abdallah (died 862) was the Tahirid governor of Khurasan from 845 until 862. He was the governor for seventeen years under Abbasid caliph al-Wathiq, al-Mutawakkil and al-Muntasir.

During his father 'Abdallah's lifetime, Tahir was sent into the steppes to the north in order to keep the Oghuz Turks in line; he probably received Samanid assistance in this venture.  When 'Abdallah died in 844, the Caliph al-Wathiq originally appointed another Tahirid, Ishaq ibn Ibrahim ibn Mus'ab, as his successor in Khurasan, but then reversed this decision and confirmed Tahir as governor.

Little is known about Tahir's rule, although there was unrest in some of the outlying provinces. Sistan, for example, was lost to the Tahirids when the 'ayyar leader Salih ibn al-Nadr drove out Tahir's governor and took power there himself. Tahir died in 862; his will stated that his young son Muhammad should succeed him as governor, and this was honored by the caliph.

References

Sources

 

Year of birth unknown
862 deaths
Tahirid governors of Khurasan
9th-century rulers in Asia
Amirs of Nishapur
9th-century Iranian people